John Frederick (born 18 October 1910, date of death unknown) was an Australian cricketer. He played three first-class cricket matches for Victoria between 1936 and 1937.

See also
 List of Victoria first-class cricketers

References

External links
 

1910 births
Year of death missing
Australian cricketers
Victoria cricketers
Cricketers from Melbourne